Dominika Zachová (born 4 June 1996) is a Czech handball player for DHK Baník Most and the Czech national team.

She participated at the 2018 European Women's Handball Championship.

Achievements
Czech First Division:
Winner: 2015, 2016, 2017, 2018, 2019

References

External links

1996 births
Living people
Sportspeople from Plzeň
Czech female handball players
21st-century Czech women